"Blue Love" is a song written and recorded by American country music duo The O'Kanes.  It was released in July 1988 as the second single from the album Tired of the Runnin'.  The song reached number 10 on the Billboard Hot Country Singles & Tracks chart.

Chart performance

References

1988 singles
1988 songs
The O'Kanes songs
Songs written by Kieran Kane
Songs written by Jamie O'Hara (singer)
Columbia Records singles